Members of the Legislative Assembly of Western Samoa were elected on 15 November 1957. The 46 members consisted of 41 Samoans elected in single-member constituency and five Europeans elected from a nationwide constituency.

List of members

References

 1957